Winfield Township is one of eleven townships in Lake County, Indiana. As of the 2010 census, its population was 10,054 and it contained 3,576 housing units.

History
Winfield Township was established in 1843, and named for Winfield Scott.

The John Ross Farm was listed in the National Register of Historic Places in 1996.

Geography

Education
Winfield Township residents are eligible to obtain a free library card from the Crown Point Community Public Library in Crown Point or Winfield.

Winfield Township, along with Center Township, is served by the Crown Point Community School Corporation which includes Crown Point High School.

See also 

 Crown Point
 Winfield 
 Lake County

References

External links
 Indiana Township Association
 United Township Association of Indiana

Townships in Lake County, Indiana
Townships in Indiana
populated places established in 1843
1843 establishments in Indiana